Tunshill is a hamlet at the northeastern edge of Milnrow, within the Metropolitan Borough of Rochdale, in Greater Manchester, England.

It  includes a golf club and numerous farms.

A small Roman statue of the goddess Victory was discovered at Tunshill Farm in 1793.

In the 1970s, the M62 motorway was built through the area.

References

External links

 Tunshill Golf Club
 Milnrow.com

Villages in Greater Manchester
Geography of the Metropolitan Borough of Rochdale